Antonio Bacci (4 September 1885 – 20 January 1971) was an Italian cardinal of the Roman Catholic Church. He served as Secretary of Briefs to Princes from 1931 to 1960, when he was elevated to the cardinalate by Pope John XXIII. He is perhaps best known for his role in the Ottaviani Intervention.

Biography
Bacci was born in Giugnola, near Florence, and ordained to the priesthood on 9 August 1909. From 1910 to 1922, he served as professor and spiritual director of the seminary in Florence. Bacci then entered the Vatican Secretariat of State in 1922 as an expert in Latin. He was raised to the rank of honorary chamberlain of his holiness on 15 March 1923, and appointed Secretary of Briefs to Princes in 1931. During his 31-year-long tenure as secretary, he prepared the Latin text of important Vatican documents during the reigns of Pius XI, Pius XII, and John XXIII. Prior to the 1958 papal conclave, he called for "a saintly Pope" who could "be a bridge between heaven and the earth ... between the social classes ... [and] a bridge among nations, even those who reject and persecute Christian religion."

John XXIII created him Cardinal-Deacon of Sant'Eugenio in the consistory of 28 March 1960. Cardinal Bacci was later named titular archbishop of Colonia in Cappadocia on 5 April 1962, and received his episcopal consecration on the following 19 April from John XXIII, with Cardinals Giuseppe Pizzardo and Benedetto Aloisi Masella serving as co-consecrators. He attended the Second Vatican Council from 1962 to 1965, and participated in the 1963 papal conclave that elected Pope Paul VI.

One of the Vatican's leading Latin experts, Bacci strongly opposed the introduction of the vernacular into the Mass. In what was known as the Ottaviani Intervention, the 84-year-old Bacci, together with 79-year-old Alfredo Ottaviani, sent to Pope Paul VI, with a short covering letter from themselves, a study by a group of theologians under the direction of Archbishop Marcel Lefebvre criticizing the draft Order of Mass of the revision of the Roman Missal. In their letter the two cardinals said that the study showed that the new Order of Mass "represents, both as a whole and in its details, a striking departure from the Catholic theology of the Mass as it was formulated in Session 22 of the Council of Trent ... to which, nonetheless, the Catholic conscience is bound forever. With the promulgation of the Novus Ordo, the loyal Catholic is thus faced with a most tragic alternative."

Among Bacci's publications was Lexicon Eorum Vocabulorum Quae Difficilius Latine Redduntur, a dictionary of modern terms in Latin; he invented such words as gummis salivaria ("chewing gum"), barbara saltatio ("the twist"), and diurnarius scriptor ("newspaper reporter"). This was a standard reference for writers of Modern Latin, especially at the Vatican, until it was superseded by the Lexicon Recentis Latinitatis.

Bacci died at Vatican City, at age 85. He is buried in his native Giugnola, near Florence.

References

External links
 The Memoirs of Antonio Cardinal Bacci translated by Dr. Anthony Lo Bello 
 "Meditations For Each Day" written by Cardinal Bacci in 1959 and translated in 1965.
 Characters of the Intervention: Bacci
 Cardinal Bacci's Address to the Council on Latin and the Vernacular in the Liturgy. First time translated into English (trans. by Timothy Wilson)

20th-century Italian cardinals
Participants in the Second Vatican Council
Coetus Internationalis Patrum
Cardinals created by Pope John XXIII
1885 births
1971 deaths
20th-century Latin-language writers
Latin-language writers from Italy
Italian Latinists